The Hino–Komuro M1908 was a blow-forward operated, semi-automatic pistol of Japanese origin and was patented by Yujiro Komuro.

The designer, Kumazo Hino, was a contemporary of the legendary firearm inventor Murata Tsuneyoshi, and was himself known as a great inventor and an aviation pioneer. Most of the records were lost when Hino's home in Tokyo was fire bombed during World War II.

It was chambered in 8mm Nambu, .32 ACP, and .25 ACP.  The 8mm chambering was later dropped, as the cartridge proved too powerful for the design. Roughly 1200 guns were made between 1908 and 1912.

In December 1992, a cache of 17 Hino–Komuro Pistols chambered in .32 ACP were found in a warehouse that are believed to have been stored for 45 years and seven were retained by Japanese authorities for evaluation when the rest were scheduled for destruction as they were not legally registered. As there are only a small number of these weapons, they are considered highly collectible firearms.

References
 "The Rare Japanese Hino-Komuro Pistol" by Harry Derby. Gun Collector’s Digest Third Edition, 1981, pp. 61–71

External links
 
Forgottenweapons.com
 YouTube.com

.25 ACP semi-automatic pistols
.32 ACP semi-automatic pistols
8×22mm Nambu firearms
Blow forward firearms
Semi-automatic pistols 1901–1909
Semi-automatic pistols of Japan
Weapons and ammunition introduced in 1908